Aglamesis Bro's is a Cincinnati, Ohio ice cream parlor chain with locations in the Oakley and Montgomery neighborhoods. The business was founded by Greek immigrant brothers in 1908. In addition to ice cream, it also produces and sells candies. The business is owned and operated by second- and third-generation family members of the original founders.

History

Aglamesis Bro's was founded by Greek immigrants Thomas and Nicholas Aglamesis.
Thomas immigrated from their family farm near Sparta, Greece in 1903; his brother Nicholas joined him in 1905. They joined the community of Greek refugees from the Balkan Wars who had settled around West Fifth Street in downtown Cincinnati.
The brothers worked at a confectionery, Coston's Confectionery, saving money to open their own confectionery business.

In 1908, with money borrowed on good faith, they opened their first ice cream parlor in Norwood, Ohio, called Aglamesis Bros. Ice Cream Parlor & Candy Shoppe.
In 1913, they opened another parlor in nearby Oakley, Cincinnati.
The building housing the parlor was one of the first buildings on Oakley Square, and was built by the Aglamesis brothers.
They closed the original Norwood location in 1917.
Aglamesis Bro's was negatively impacted by sugar rationing during WWII, though their sales increased dramatically post-war.
Until the 1950s, the Aglamesis family lived above the parlor.
James Aglamesis, son of founder Thomas Aglamesis, took over operation of the business in 1952 when his father experienced a stroke.
Thomas died in 1961, preceded in death by Nicholas in 1950.
A second location in Montgomery, Ohio was opened in 1970.
James's daughter Dianne Lytle manages retail, marketing, and accounting, while her half-brother Randal Young manages manufacturing and wholesale accounts.
In modern times, it is considered one of the few surviving "genuine old-fashioned" ice cream parlors in Cincinnati.

Historic features

The Oakley location retains several features original to its opening state in 1913. The Oakley location has the original hand-laid tile floor as well as its tin ceiling.
Other original features include marble-topped tables, a candy counter, and soda fountain.
It also still has Tiffany lamps that were purchased in the 1920s. Seating is on traditional ice-cream parlor chairs with wire backs twisted into heart shapes.

Distinctions
In 2014 the New York Times called them one of the "precious few real ice cream parlors left" alongside Fentons Creamery, Yarnell's, and Toscanini's, calling out their fancy dishware and twisted-wire parlor chairs. 
Additionally, the New York Times has referenced the business three times in their "What's Doing In" travel column in 1976, 1988, and 1999.
In 2008, the Aglamesis Bro's was featured on Modern Marvels on the History Channel. Additionally, as of 2008, the Ohio Department of Agriculture noted that they were the last ice cream parlor in Ohio to make their ice cream from scratch.
The magazine Bon Appétit included Aglamesis Bro's on their list of the "last authentic ice cream parlors in the United States", and Chocolatier magazine called them one of the top 25 ice creams in the United States. 
Taste of Home included Aglamesis Bro's on their list of "America’s Best Soda Fountains from Coast to Coast".
Al Gore visited for a photo op during his 2000 presidential campaign.
A Gibson Greetings birthday card once pictured a boy and a girl drinking soda at Aglamesis Bro's.

In 2016, Aglamesis Bro's was featured in an exhibit in the National Hellenic Museum titled "Sweet Home Chicago: The History of America’s Candy Capital". While the exhibit was focused on the culture of candy in Chicago, the National Hellenic Museum expanded the exhibit by adding eight panels about the role of Greek immigrants in developing candy and ice cream shops in the United States.
In addition to Thomas and Nicholas Aglamesis, other Greek immigrants included were Leo Stefanos (founder of Dove chocolate brand), and Leonidas Kestekides (founder of chocolate company Leonidas).

Products

In addition to ice cream, Aglamesis Bro's have also produced hand-dipped chocolates since 1908.
In 2003, it was estimated that they utilized  of chocolate per year producing candies.
Their most popular candy sold is the opera cream—a cream, butter, and sugar center coated in dark chocolate.
In 1997, their opera creams were deemed best in Cincinnati by The Cincinnati Enquirer among ten contestants.
As of 1990, James Aglamesis estimated they produced  of ice cream per week during the summer.

According to St. Louis Post-Dispatch food writer (and former Cincinnatian) Daniel Neman, comparing them to the much larger local chain Graeter's, "(a) lot of Cincinnatians will tell you that the best tasting ice cream is actually found at Aglamesis Bros."

Locations
As of 2019, Aglamesis Bro's had two locations. In addition to Oakley Square, they have a second location in Montgomery Square Shopping Centre.

References

Ice cream parlors in the United States
Restaurants established in 1908
1908 establishments in Ohio
Ice cream brands
Cuisine of Cincinnati